Lectionary 229, designated by siglum ℓ 229 (in the Gregory-Aland numbering) is a Greek manuscript of the New Testament, on parchment. Palaeographically it has been assigned to the 13th century. 
Scrivener labelled it by 223evl.
The manuscript has complex context.

Description 

The codex contains lessons from the Gospels of John, Matthew, Luke lectionary (Evangelistarium), on 177 parchment leaves. The text is written in Greek minuscule letters, in two columns per page, 26 lines per page. It contains musical notes.

There are daily lessons from Easter to Pentecost.

It contains the Pericope Adulterae (John 8:3-11) dedicated to Pelagia.

History 

Scrivener and Gregory dated the manuscript to the 13th century. It has been assigned by the INTF to the 13th century.

Of the early history of the codex nothing is known.

The manuscript was added to the list of New Testament manuscripts by Scrivener (number 223) and Gregory (number 229). Gregory saw it in 1883. It was examined by S. T. Bloomfield.

The manuscript is not cited in the critical editions of the Greek New Testament (UBS3).

It used to be held in Lambeth Palace. The codex is now housed at the Antiquariat Christi (1187) in London.

See also 

 List of New Testament lectionaries
 Biblical manuscript
 Textual criticism
 Lectionary 230
 Lectionary 231

Notes and references

Bibliography 

 

Greek New Testament lectionaries
13th-century biblical manuscripts